The Long-Bang Trade Plaza, also Long-Ban World Trade Building or Long-Bong Trade Plaza, is a complex of twin skyscraper office buildings located in West District, Taichung, Taiwan. The buildings were completed in 1991 and were one of the earliest skyscrapers built in Taichung, as well as the first buildings to reach  in the city. The complex was designed by TMA Architects and Associates. As of December 2020, the buildings are the 11th tallest buildings in Taichung.

See also 
 List of tallest buildings in Taiwan
 List of tallest buildings in Taichung
 Ling-Ding Tower

References

External Links
 

1993 establishments in Taiwan
Skyscraper office buildings in Taichung
Office buildings completed in 1993
Buildings and structures in Taichung